Fred Birtles (6 April 1903–1985) was an English footballer who played in the Football League for Crewe Alexandra and Hartlepools United.

References

1903 births
1985 deaths
English footballers
Association football forwards
English Football League players
Crewe Alexandra F.C. players
Hartlepool United F.C. players
Chester F.C. players
Altrincham F.C. players
Stalybridge Celtic F.C. players
Mossley A.F.C. players